Ball State Cardinals basketball may refer to either of the basketball teams that represent Ball State University:

Ball State Cardinals men's basketball
Ball State Cardinals women's basketball